van Oekel is a Dutch surname. Notable people with it include:

Matt Van Oekel (born 1986), American association football goalkeeper 
Sjef van Oekel, Dutch TV comedy character

See also
Van Roekel

Dutch-language surnames